The Canadian Vickers Vanessa was a Canadian biplane transport seaplane of the 1920s.  It was a single-engine, twin-float biplane of mixed construction, evaluated by the Royal Canadian Air Force and used for experimental air-mail services..

Design and development
The Vanessa  was developed as a private venture commercial seaplane.  The Canadian Vickers Chief Engineer based his design on the contemporary Stinson cabin biplane which had been introduced in the United States. The one feature that was a departure from the Stinson was the use of interplane struts which formed an "X" (when viewed from the front), thus eliminating the need for traditional wire bracing and allowing easy access to the cabin. The enclosed cabin fuselage was constructed of steel tubing as were various support structures along with the tail surfaces. The remainder of the aircraft was of wood construction and the entire aircraft was fabric covered.

Ailerons and flaps, the latter being an unusual feature in aircraft of that time, were fitted to each of the equal span wings and were also interconnected by struts.

Testing
A prototype, G-CYZJ,  was constructed, after which the Royal Canadian Air Force evinced an interest in the type as a communications aircraft. Service testing indicated that the aircraft was under-powered and the Armstrong Siddeley Lynx was replaced with a  Wright Whirlwind

In September 1927, the still experimental Vickers Vanessa was used for series of trial airmail runs involving the first airmail delivery. While waiting off the dock at Rimouski, Quebec, on 9 September 1927, Royal Canadian Air Force Squadron Leader John H. Tudhope received  of mail from the inbound RMS Empress of France  While taxiing the Vanessa for takeoff, a strut ruptured and punctured the aircraft's starboard float causing it to tip over to that side. The propeller lopped off half the float and the machine broke up, resulting in the aircraft sinking. Tudhope scrambled to safety and the mail was rescued, eventually reaching its destinations by rail.

Following a subsequent salvage, the Vanessa was considered uneconomical to repair and was abandoned.

Despite a very brief career, the Vanessa has the distinction of being one of the first enclosed cabin aircraft to be designed and built in Canada and the first aircraft to be used in an experimental airmail flight in Canada.

Specifications (Vanessa–Lynx engine)

References

Bibliography
 

1920s Canadian civil utility aircraft
Vanessa
Biplanes
Single-engined tractor aircraft